Kwai Shing East Estate is a public housing estate in Kwai Shing, Kwai Chung, New Territories, Hong Kong located at the east of Kwai Shing West Estate and near MTR Kwai Hing station. It consists of ten residential blocks completed between 1990 and 2003.

History
Kwai Shing East Estate was formerly Kwai Shing Estate which had nine blocks (blocks 12 to 20) completed in 1972 and 1973. In 1977, these blocks were renamed as Kwai Shing East Estate. In 1985, the HKHA announced that the strength of the concrete in Blocks 18 and 20 of the estate were below standard. Those blocks were demolished in 1989. The remaining blocks (except block 12) were demolished and replaced by new buildings in the 1990s and 2000s. In 1995, Block 12 was converted into Interim Housing temporarily to settle people ineligible for public rental housing. But in 2008, the Hong Kong Housing Authority announced plans to demolish block 12 in 2010.

Houses

Demographics
According to the 2016 by-census, Kwai Shing East Estate had a population of 19,805. The median age was 45.8 and the majority of residents (97.5 per cent) were of Chinese ethnicity. The average household size was 3.1 people. The median monthly household income of all households (i.e. including both economically active and inactive households) was HK$22,990.

Politics
Kwai Shing East Estate is located in Kwai Shing East Estate constituency of the Kwai Tsing District Council. It was formerly represented by Rayman Chow Wai-hung, who was elected in the 2019 elections until July 2021.

See also

Public housing estates in Kwai Chung

References

Residential buildings completed in 1972
Residential buildings completed in 1990
Kwai Shing
Public housing estates in Hong Kong